Ronald Long (January 30, 1911 – October 23, 1986), was a British actor who appeared principally in American television shows of the 1950s, 1960s and 1970s.

Early years 
Long was born in London and performed at the Old Vic Theatre there before moving to America in the late 1940s.

Career 
His longest-running role was portraying Evans Baker on the CBS daytime soap opera Love of Life for four years. His roles on Broadway included the police inspector in the drama, A Pin to See the Peep Show (1953), and Dr. Blimber in the comedy Nature's Way (1957). His film debut was in Two Loves (1961).

Long had character roles in 1960s sitcoms, including Get Smart, Hogan's Heroes, I Dream of Jeannie, and Green Acres. He had several roles on Bewitched, including Henry VIII in a two-part episode in 1971. He also played the loud and blustery Captain Bligh/Charles Laughton-like "Admiral Zahrk" who constantly bellowed about "Mister Kidno" and his missing goat cheese in the Lost in Space episode "Mutiny in Space." He made three guest appearances on Perry Mason, including the role of title character Arthur Hennings, who, as a former Nazi official, had assumed a new identity, in the 1961 episode, "The Case of the Renegade Refugee." He also played murder victim Franz Hoffer in the 1965 episode, "The Case of the Fugitive Fraulein." Other TV appearances include parts on Alfred Hitchcock Presents, Batman (episode 110 in 1967), The Time Tunnel, The Man From U.N.C.L.E.,  Mission: Impossible, Mannix and Columbo.

Long also appeared as the picky eater in a Stan Freberg advertisement for Sunsweet Pitted Prunes.  Satisfied that his objection to prune pits had been resolved, Long remarked, "They're still rather badly wrinkled, you know."

Death 
Long died at the age of 75 in Burbank, California.

Filmography

References

External links

Ronald Long (filmography) at The New York Times

1911 births
1986 deaths
British expatriate male actors in the United States
Male actors from London
British male television actors
British male film actors
British male stage actors
20th-century English male actors